Ngabwe District is a district of Central Province, Zambia. It was separated from Kapiri Mposhi District in 2012.

References 

Districts of Central Province, Zambia